Meroles reticulatus, the reticulate sand lizard, is a species of sand-dwelling lizard in the family Lacertidae. It occurs in Namibia and Angola.

References

Meroles
Reptiles of Namibia
Reptiles of Angola
Reptiles described in 1867
Taxa named by José Vicente Barbosa du Bocage